Gilbert Abeiku Aggrey Santana (born 16 February 1977) also known as Abeiku Santana is a Ghanaian media personality and entrepreneur. He is also the CEO of Kaya Tours Ghana Limited a Ghanaian travel company.

Early life and education
Santana was born in Koforidua in the Eastern Region of Ghana. He started his basic education in Koforidua at Nana Kwaku Boateng Experimental School and he later attended Ghana National College, Cape Coast for his Ordinary Level certificate. He then attended Ghana Senior High School, Koforidua for his Advanced level Certificate.

He holds master's degree in Tourism Management from the University of Cape Coast, a Post Graduate in Public Administration from Ghana Institute of Management and Public Administration, Associate in Legal Studies and Litigation from New York Paralegal School, Advance Certificate in Public Relations and Advertising from Ghana Institute of Journalism. Santana is currently pursuing another master's degree at the University of Ghana Business School (UGBS).

Career
Santana started his career in media as Assistant Programs Manager at Radio Z in Koforidua. He later moved to Radio Mercury where he worked as a Deputy Programs Manager from 1991 to 2001. From 2001 to 2002, he served as a radio drive time host for Ash FM 101.1 in Kumasi.

In 2002, he moved to the Multimedia Broadcasting Group as a Radio host and later rose to become Head of Music programs and Events Promotion Coordinator until he left in 2010 to join the Despite Media Group's Okay FM.

Santana was appointed as an ambassador for the COVID-19 National Trust Fund.

Tourism
Santana is the CEO and founder of Kaya Tours Ghana Limited where he was later named as a Tourism Ambassador for Ghana in 2017.

Awards
Abeiku Santana won the RTP Personality Of The Year at the 2021 Radio and Television Personality Awards.
He was nominated for the PAV Ansah Communicator Award in the 2019 EMY Awards in Ghana.
He won Special Recognition Award for Tourism Marketing and Promotion at the EMY Awards in 2020 for his contribution to tourism in Ghana.

Personal life
Abeiku Santana is married to Genevieve Benyiwah Aggrey after divorcing his first wife.

Reference

External links 
 
 

Ghanaian journalists
Living people
Ghanaian radio presenters
1977 births
Ghanaian broadcasters
Ghanaian business executives
Ghanaian chief executives
Ghana National College alumni
University of Ghana alumni
University of Cape Coast alumni
Ghana Institute of Management and Public Administration alumni
Ghana Senior High School (Koforidua) alumni